The 2019 Changan Ford International Curling Elite was held from December 5 to 10 in Xining, Qinghai, China. The total purse for the event was CNY 225,000.

In the men's final, Team Ruohonen from the United States defeated Team van Dorp from the Netherlands 5-4. Team Kim from Korea won the bronze medal with a 7-3 win over Canada's Team Horgan.

In the women's final, Team Kovaleva from Russia beat Team Kim from Korea 6-4. Switzerland's Team Feltscher won the bronze medal game 7-5 against the 2019 Pacific-Asia Curling Championships winner Team Han from China.

Men

Teams

The teams are listed as follows:

Round-robin standings 
Final round-robin standings

Round-robin results 
All draw times are listed in China Standard Time (UTC+08:00).

Draw 1
Thursday, December 5, 09:30

Draw 2
Thursday, December 5, 18:30

Draw 3
Friday, December 6, 14:00

Draw 4
Saturday, December 7, 09:30

Draw 5
Saturday, December 7, 18:30

Draw 6
Sunday, December 8, 14:00

Draw 7
Monday, December 9, 09:30

Playoffs

Source:

Semifinals
Monday, December 9, 19:30

Bronze-medal game
Tuesday, December 10, 09:30

Final
Tuesday, December 10, 09:30

Women

Teams

The teams are listed as follows:

Round-robin standings 
Final round-robin standings

Round-robin results 
All draw times are listed in China Standard Time (UTC+08:00).

Draw 1
Thursday, December 5, 14:00

Draw 2
Friday, December 6, 09:30

Draw 3
Friday, December 6, 18:30

Draw 4
Saturday, December 7, 14:00

Draw 5
Sunday, December 8, 09:30

Draw 6
Sunday, December 8, 18:30

Draw 7
Monday, December 9, 14:00

Playoffs

Source:

Semifinals
Monday, December 9, 19:30

Bronze-medal game
Tuesday, December 10, 14:00

Final
Tuesday, December 10, 14:00

References

External links
Men's Event
Women's Event

2019 in curling
December 2019 sports events in China
International curling competitions hosted by China
Xining